Hu Heming (born 21 March 1994) is an Australian table tennis player who has competed at the 2016 Summer Olympics and 2020 Summer Olympics.

Career
At the 2020 Summer Olympics, the team of Chris Yan, David Powell and Heming advanced to the round of 16 where they were beaten by Japan 3-0. Australia at the 2020 Summer Olympics details the results in depth.

His highest Men's World Ranking was 61 in September 2019, and number 1 in the Australia and Oceania Region for 4 years (2017-2021), before he announced his retirement on March 21, 2022.

Heming represented Australia at the 2014 & 2018 Commonwealth Games. He is the 2018 & and 2019 Oceania Cup Champion and qualified to represent Australia at the 2018 and 2019 Men's World Cups.

References

1994 births
Living people
Australian male table tennis players
Australian people of Chinese descent
Olympic table tennis players of Australia
Table tennis players at the 2016 Summer Olympics
Table tennis players at the 2018 Commonwealth Games
Commonwealth Games competitors for Australia
Table tennis players at the 2020 Summer Olympics
20th-century Australian people
21st-century Australian people